Loveday is a town and locality in the Riverland region of South Australia, located south of Barmera and near the Murray River. Administratively it is part of the Berri Barmera Council LGA. At the 2006 census, Loveday had a population of 1,071.

History
Located east of the Moorook Game Reserve, Loveday was known for its Internment Camp during World War II. The camp was established in 1941 and was one of the largest in Australia, covering approximately 180 hectares. Italian anti-fascist activist Francesco Fantin was killed there by a fellow internee. The camp was closed in December 1946.

The Cobdogla Irrigation and Steam Museum has a substantial display devoted to the Loveday internment camp, maintained by the National Trust (check their website for open days).

The historic Loveday Internment Camp General Headquarters Site in Thiele Road and Brick Boiler Stack, Loveday Irrigation Scheme Pumping Station in Morris Street are listed on the South Australian Heritage Register.

Loveday was named after Ernest Alfred Loveday, a surveyor in the South Australian Irrigation Department.

Today Loveday is a popular 4 x 4 adventure park. Loveday is close to the Murray River lagoons, known as the "Loveday Lagoons".

See also
Loveday Camp 9
 Loveday Camp 10
 Loveday Camp 14

References

External links
Loveday during WWII
Map and location
Loveday Project research website

Towns in South Australia
Riverland